Klisa  may refer to:

 Klisa, Bihać, a village in Bosnia and Herzegovina
 Klisa, Serbia, a part of the city of Novi Sad, Serbia
 Klisa, Osijek-Baranja County, a village near Osijek, Croatia
 Klisa, Požega-Slavonia County, a village near Velika, Croatia